The play-offs of the 2019 Fed Cup Asia/Oceania Zone Group II were the final stages of the Group II Zonal Competition involving teams from Asia and Oceania. Using the positions determined in their pools, the thirteen teams faced off to determine their placing in the 2019 Fed Cup Asia/Oceania Zone Group II. The top team advanced to Asia/Oceania Group I in 2020.

Pool results

Promotional play-offs 
The first placed teams of the pools were drawn in head-to-head rounds. The winners advanced to the Asia/Oceania Group I in 2020.

Chinese Taipei vs. Singapore

Uzbekistan vs. Hong Kong

3rd to 4th play-offs
The second placed teams of the pools were drawn in head-to-head rounds to find the equal third to equal fourth placed teams.

Philippines vs. Sri Lanka

New Zealand vs. Malaysia

5th to 6th play-offs
The third placed teams of the pools were drawn in head-to-head rounds to find the equal fifth to equal sixth placed teams.

Iran vs. Tajikistan

Pakistan vs. Turkmenistan

Final placements 

See also 
 Fed Cup structure

References

External links 
 Fed Cup website

P2